Karahunj is a village in the Goris Municipality of the Syunik Province in Armenia.

Demographics

Population 
The Statistical Committee of Armenia reported its population was 1,303 in 2010, up from 1,254 at the 2001 census.

Gallery

Notable people
 Norair Aslanyan (1991-), footballer

References 

Populated places in Syunik Province